Samisoni Viriviri (1953 - 28 April 2021, Sacramento, USA)  was a Fijian rugby union footballer and coach. He played as a scrum-half. He is grandfather of his namesake; Samisoni Viriviri, who plays as wing for Fiji.

Playing career
His first cap for Fiji was during a match against Australia, at Brisbane, on 9 June 1976. His last cap was during a match against England XV, at Twickenham, on 16 October 1982. In his career he played 24 matches and scored 12 points, 1 try, 1 penalty, 1 drop goal and 1 conversion. He was also part of the legendary 1977 Fiji XV that beat the British and Irish Lions in Suva.

Coaching career
Between 1989 and 1991, Viriviri coached the Fiji national rugby union team, which he coached during the 1991 Rugby World Cup.

References

External links

2021 deaths
Fijian rugby union coaches
Fijian rugby union players
Sportspeople from Nadi
Date of birth unknown
Fiji international rugby union players
Rugby union scrum-halves
Rugby union fly-halves
I-Taukei Fijian people
1953 births